Ingallston Township is a civil township of Menominee County in the U.S. state of Michigan. The population was 1,042 at the 2000 census.

Geography
The former community of Greenwoods is located in Ingallston Township, northeast of Carbondale.

Demographics
As of the census of 2000, there were 1,042 people, 456 households, and 316 families residing in the township.  The population density was 14.7 per square mile (5.7/km2).  There were 758 housing units at an average density of 10.7 per square mile (4.1/km2).  The racial makeup of the township was 98.27% White, 0.67% Native American, 0.48% Asian, and 0.58% from two or more races. Hispanic or Latino of any race were 0.10% of the population.

There were 456 households, out of which 23.9% had children under the age of 18 living with them, 60.7% were married couples living together, 4.6% had a female householder with no husband present, and 30.7% were non-families. 27.4% of all households were made up of individuals, and 12.5% had someone living alone who was 65 years of age or older.  The average household size was 2.29 and the average family size was 2.77.

In the township the population was spread out, with 20.3% under the age of 18, 4.3% from 18 to 24, 25.0% from 25 to 44, 32.0% from 45 to 64, and 18.3% who were 65 years of age or older.  The median age was 45 years. For every 100 females, there were 98.9 males.  For every 100 females age 18 and over, there were 98.6 males.

The median income for a household in the township was $37,361, and the median income for a family was $40,769. Males had a median income of $32,315 versus $22,333 for females. The per capita income for the township was $18,232.  About 5.4% of families and 8.3% of the population were below the poverty line, including 6.8% of those under age 18 and 9.8% of those age 65 or over.

References

Townships in Menominee County, Michigan
Marinette micropolitan area
Townships in Michigan
Michigan populated places on Lake Michigan